Pleioplanidae is a family of flatworms belonging to the order Polycladida.

Genera:
 Izmira Bulnes, 2010
 Laqueusplana Rodríguez, Grande, Bulnes, Almon, Perez & Noreña, 2017
 Melloplana
 Persica
 Pleioplana Faubel, 1983

References

Platyhelminthes